Germishuys is a surname. Notable people with the surname include:

Gerrie Germishuys (born 1949), South African rugby union player
Hanco Germishuys (born 1996), South African born American rugby union player
Ross Geldenhuys (born 1983), South African rugby union player